Thiérry Aymes (born 15 October 1973) is a French former gymnast. He tied for fourth place in the floor final at the 1996 Summer Olympics.

References

External links
 

1973 births
Living people
French male artistic gymnasts
Olympic gymnasts of France
Gymnasts at the 1996 Summer Olympics
People from Ollioules
Sportspeople from Var (department)
20th-century French people